Rúsdrekkasøla Landsins, or simply  Rúsan, is the national alcoholic beverage retailing monopoly of the Faroe Islands, following the model of neighbouring Nordic alcohol monopolies Vinmonopolet, Systembolaget, Vínbúð and Alko. The company was founded in 1992 after a long period of rationing and shipping such goods from Denmark. The company has outlets in Tórshavn, Hoyvík, Klaksvík, Saltangará, Miðvágur, Sandur and Trongisvágur.

See also
 Alcohol monopoly
 List of companies of the Faroe Islands

References

External links
 Rúsdrekkasøla Landsins

Alcohol monopolies
Drink companies of the Faroe Islands
Food and drink companies established in 1992
Retail companies established in 1992
1992 establishments in the Faroe Islands
Alcohol in Denmark

de:Prohibition auf den Färöern#Rúsdrekkasøla Landsins